Albert Gordon Robertson (10 October 1880 – 10 January 1939) was an Australian rules footballer who played for the St Kilda Football Club in the Victorian Football League (VFL).

References

External links 

1880 births
1939 deaths
Australian rules footballers from Victoria (Australia)
St Kilda Football Club players
South Yarra Football Club players